Race the Sun may refer to:

 Race the Sun (film), a 1996 comedy-drama film
 Race the Sun (video game), a 2013 endless runner video game

See also
 Race to the Sun, a nickname of the Paris–Nice cycling stage race
 Race to the Sun (novel), by Rebecca Roanhorse (2020)